Merostomoidea is a paraphyletic group of fossil arthropods.  They have been described as a transitional form between trilobites and true chelicerates.

Sources

 https://web.archive.org/web/20101221002449/http://palaeos.com/Invertebrates/Arthropods/Arachnomorpha.html#Merostomoidea

Arthropod classes
Prehistoric protostome classes
Cambrian arthropods